Marco Ruffo as known as Marco Fryazin (Марк Фрязин, Марко Фрязин and Марко Руффо in Russian) was an Italian architect active in Moscow in the 15th century.

The Fryazin title originates from the old Russian word фрязь (fryaz), derived from frank, that was used to denote people from Northern Italy. Beside Marco Ruffo, at least three contemporary Italians had this nickname in Russia: Antonio Fryazin (Antonio Gislardi), Bon Fryazin (Marco Bon), Aleviz Fryazin (Aloisio da Milano).

One of the chronicles says that Marco Ruffo worked in Moscow in 1485–1495 at the invitation of Ivan III. He built a number of the Kremlin towers, including the Beklemishevskaya, Spasskaya and Nikolskaya towers. In 1491, together with Pietro Antonio Solari, Marco Ruffo finished the construction of the Palace of Facets.

In December 1991, in Moscow, UNESCO celebrated Palace of Facets' 500th jubilee.

References
Moscow Academy of Architecture, РУССКОЕ ГРАДОСТРОИТЕЛЬНОЕ ИСКУСТВО, Strojizdat, 1993

15th-century Italian architects
Architects from Moscow
Year of death unknown
Year of birth unknown